Roman Andreyevich Sorokin (born May 17, 1985) is a former Russian professional football player.

External links
 
 

1985 births
Living people
Russian footballers
Association football midfielders
FC Zenit-2 Saint Petersburg players
FC Saturn Ramenskoye players
FC Vitebsk players
FC Naftan Novopolotsk players
FC Belshina Bobruisk players
Belarusian Premier League players
Russian expatriate footballers
Expatriate footballers in Belarus